Park Ridge South is a residential locality in the City of Logan, Queensland, Australia.

Geography
The Mount Lindesay Highway enters the locality from the north (Park Ridge) and exits to the south (Munruben), roughly bisecting the locality into east and west sections.

History
Once a rural community, it is developing into a low density residential area. Park Ridge South was officially gazetted as a locality in 1991. It was previously part of the Beaudesert Shire local government area. Rosia Road and Stoney Camp Road at Park Ridge South formed part of the boundary between the local government areas of Beaudesert Shire and Logan City. The 2008 Queensland Local Government amalgamations saw former suburbs of Beaudesert Shire including Park Ridge South becoming part of Logan City.

The median age of the Park Ridge South population was 40 years, 3 years above the national median of 37.  73.8% of people living in Park Ridge South were born in Australia. The other top responses for country of birth were England 6.2%, New Zealand 4.6%, Taiwan 1%, China 0.8%, Croatia 0.7%.  84.2% of people spoke only English at home; the next most common languages were 1.7% Khmer, 1.5% Mandarin, 1.1% Hmong, 1% Croatian, 0.7% Italian.

Education
There are no schools in Park Ridge South. The nearest government primary schools are Park Ridge State School in neighbouring Park Ridge to the north and Greenbank State School in neighbouring Greenbank to the west. The nearest government secondary school is Park Ridge State High School in Park Ridge.

References

External links

 

Suburbs of Logan City
Localities in Queensland